The Tropeiro seedeater (Sporophila beltoni) is a species of birds in the tanager family. It is endemic to Brazil. Formerly lumped with the plumbeous seedeater (S. plumbea), it was described as a new species in 2013.

Etymology
The specific epithet honours American ornithologist William Belton, who made extensive studies of the vocalisations of the birds of Rio Grande do Sul. The common name alludes to the species’ breeding range and migration pattern, which is similar to the historic Rota dos Tropeiros, the drovers' road used to drive livestock to markets in south-eastern Brazil from the early 18th century to 1930.

Description
The adult male is distinguished from the plumbeous seedeater by its larger size and bluish (rather than plumbeous) grey plumage, and from that and other Sporophila seedeaters, by having a robust, bright yellow beak with an arched culmen, and by vocalisations that include unique call notes.

Distribution and habitat
Tropeiro seedeaters breed in upland shrubby grasslands associated with the Araucaria forests of southern Brazil. They migrate northwards to spend the austral winter – the non-breeding season – in the Cerrado savannas of central Brazil. The range contains a narrow contact zone between the Tropeiro and plumbeous seedeaters, where the birds are segregated by habitat that contains little significant gene flow.

See also 
 Tropeiro

References

Sporophila
Birds of the Atlantic Forest
Endemic birds of Brazil
Birds described in 2013